Bad Woman, Good Woman is a 2007 South Korean television series starring Choi Jin-sil, Lee Jae-ryong, Sung Hyun-ah, and Jeon No-min. It aired on Mondays to Fridays at 19:45 on MBC from January 1 to July 13, 2007 for 140 episodes.

The daily drama explores the true meaning of family and love, as a wife who considers herself a "good woman" agonizingly finds out about her husband's 6-year-long affair.

Plot
Se-young is (Choi Jin-sil) is a devoted wife and mother who greatly values her family and home life. She loves her doctor husband Geon-woo (Lee Jae-ryong) very deeply, and affectionately takes care of her old mother-in-law who is afflicted with dementia, as well as her daughter whom she did not give birth to. But unbeknownst to her, for the past six years Geon-woo has been having an affair with his first love, Seo-kyung (Sung Hyun-ah), who herself is married to Tae-hyun (Jeon No-min). Things come to a head when Geon-woo and Seo-kyung take their families to Saipan for an international medical seminar. Se-young and Tae-hyun are looking forward to a second honeymoon with their respective spouses, not knowing that Geon-woo and Seo-kyung are secretly meeting for trysts. When Se-young discovers her husband's infidelity, her world goes to pieces.

Cast

Main characters
Choi Jin-sil as Lee Se-young
Lee Jae-ryong as Song Geon-woo
Sung Hyun-ah as Yoon Seo-kyung
Jeon No-min as Kim Tae-hyun

Supporting characters
Lee Hyo-choon as Lee Kyung-seon
Kim Yong-rim as Mrs. Song 
Ha Seung-ri as Song Jin-ah
Kim Ji-woo as Song Ji-woo
Baek Il-seob as Kim Bong-dal 
Nam Yoon-jung as Choi Mal-ja
Chae Jin-geon as Kim Tae-wook 
Lee Yoon-mi as Kim Tae-hee 
Lee Sang-gil as Kim Woo-ram
Yoo Seo-jin as Lee So-young
Kyung Joon as Han Sang-jin
Shin Dong-mi as Jang Ji-seon
Han In-soo as Seo-kyung's father
Park Hye-won
Lee Jin-sung
Song Min-jung as nurse
Shin Shin-ae Gwi-ok
 Kim Young-sun as Yeon Byeon-daek

References

External links
Bad Woman, Good Woman official MBC website 
Bad Woman, Good Woman at MBC Global Media

2007 South Korean television series debuts
2007 South Korean television series endings
2010s South Korean television series
MBC TV television dramas
Korean-language television shows
South Korean romance television series